Jerzy Mierzejewski (13 July 1917 – 14 June 2012) was a Polish painter, pedagogue and long-term dean of Cinematography and Directing at the Łódź fim school. He was the son of Jacek Mierzejewski, and brother of Andrzej Mierzejewski, both also painters.

Awards 

 Jan Cybis Award (1997)
 Honorary Doctorate Honoris-Causa of the Łódź fim school (2006)

References 

2012 deaths
Cubist artists
Modern painters
1917 births
20th-century Polish painters
20th-century Polish male artists
Artists from Kraków
Academic staff of Łódź Film School
Polish male painters